The Junior women's race at the 1997 IAAF World Cross Country Championships was held in Torino, Italy, at the Parco del Valentino on March 23, 1997.  A report on the event was given in The New York Times in the Herald, and for the IAAF.

Complete results, medallists, and the results of British athletes were published.

Race results

Junior women's race (4.689 km)

Individual

Teams

Note: Athletes in parentheses did not score for the team result

Participation
An unofficial count yields the participation of 138 athletes from 39 countries in the Junior women's race.  This is in agreement with the official numbers as published.

 (6)
 (1)
 (3)
 (4)
 (6)
 (4)
 (1)
 (1)
 (6)
 (4)
 (6)
 (5)
 (5)
 (4)
 (1)
 (6)
 (6)
 (1)
 (6)
 (1)
 (1)
 (2)
 (6)
 (2)
 (1)
 (1)
 (1)
 (6)
 (4)
 (1)
 (6)
 (6)
 (4)
 (2)
 (1)
 (6)
 (6)
 (4)
 (1)

See also
 1997 IAAF World Cross Country Championships – Senior men's race
 1997 IAAF World Cross Country Championships – Junior men's race
 1997 IAAF World Cross Country Championships – Senior women's race

References

Junior women's race at the World Athletics Cross Country Championships
IAAF World Cross Country Championships
1997 in women's athletics
1997 in youth sport